The necropolis of El-Khokha is located on the west bank of the river Nile at Thebes, Egypt. The necropolis is surrounds a hill and has five Old Kingdom tombs and over 50 tombs from the 18th, 19th and 20th dynasties as well as some from the First Intermediate Period and the Late Period.

Tombs
 TT39 - Puimre, Second Prophet of Amun, from the time of Hatshepsut
 TT48 - Amenemhat, also called Surer, Chief Steward; from the time of Amenhotep III
 TT49 - Neferhotep, Chief Scribe of Amun, from the 19th Dynasty
 TT172 - Mentiywiy Royal Butler, child of the nursery; from the time of Tuthmosis III to Amenhotep II
 TT173 - Khay, Scribe of divine offerings of the gods of Thebes, from the 19th Dynasty
 TT174 - Ashakhet, Priest in front of Mut; from the 20th Dynasty
 TT175 - Unknown, from the 18th Dynasty
 TT176 - Userhet, Servant of Amun, clean of hands; from the 18th Dynasty
 TT177 - Amenemopet, Scribe of Truth in the Ramesseum in the estate of Amun, from the time of Ramesses II
 TT178 - Kenro, also called Neferrenpet, Scribe of the treasury in the Amun-Ra domain, from the time of Ramesses II
 TT179 - Nebamon, Scribe, Counter of grain in the granary of divine offerings of Amun, from the time of Hatshepsut
 TT180 - Unknown, from the 19th Dynasty
 TT181 - Ipuky and Nebamon, Sculptor of Pharaoh and Head sculptor of Pharaoh resp.; from the Late 18th Dynasty
 TT182 - Amenemhat, Scribe of the mat, from the time of Thutmose III
 TT183 - Nebsumenu, Chief Steward, Steward in the house of Ramesses II, from the time of Ramesses II
 TT184 - Nefermenu, Mayor of Thebes, Royal Scribe, from the time of Ramesses II
 TT185 - Senioker, Treasurer of the God, Hereditary Prince, Divine Chancellor; from the First Intermediate Period
 TT186 - Ihy, Governor; from the First Intermediate Period
 TT187 - Pakhihet, wab-priest of Amun; from the 20th Dynasty
 TT198 - Riya, Head of the magazine of Amun in Karnak; from the Ramesside Period
 TT199 - Amenarnefru, Overseer of the store-rooms; from the 18th Dynasty
 TT200 - Dedi, Governor of the deserts on the wet of Thebes, Head of the troops of Pharaoh; from the time of Tuthmosis III - Amenhotep II
 TT201 - Re, First herald of the king; from the 18th Dynasty
 TT202 - Nakhtamun, Prophet of Ptah Lord of Thebes, Priest in front of Amun; from the 19th Dynasty
 TT203 - Wennefer, Divine Father of Mut; from the 19th Dynasty, Ramesses II
 TT204 - Nebanensu, Sailor of the high priest of Amun; from the 18th Dynasty
 TT205 - Tutmosis, Royal Butler; from the 18th Dynasty
 TT206 - Ipuemheb, Scribe of the Place of Truth; from the Ramesside Period
 TT207 - Horemheb, Scribe of divine offerings of Amun; from the Ramesside Period
 TT208 - Roma, Divine Father of Amun-Ra; from the Ramesside Period
 TT209 - Seremhatrekhyt, Hereditary Prince, Sole beloved friend; from the Late Period (Saite)
 TT238 - Neferweben, Royal butler clean of hands; from the 18th Dynasty
 TT245 - Hori, Scribe, Overseer of the estate of the great wife of the king; from the 18th Dynasty
 TT246 - Senenre, Scribe ; from the 18th Dynasty
 TT247 - Samut, Scribe, Counter of cattle of Amun; from the 18th Dynasty
 TT248 - Tutmosis, Maker of offerings of Thutmose III; from the 18th Dynasty
 TT253 - Khnummose, from the 18th Dynasty (Amenhotep III)
 TT254 - Mose (Amenmose), from the Late 18th Dynasty
 TT256 - Nebenkemet 	
 TT257 - Mahu or Neferhotep 	
 TT258 - Menkheper 		
 TT264 - Ipiy 	
 TT294 - Amenhotep (Usurped by Roma), from the time of Amenhotep II
 TT295 - Paroy, also called Tuhmosis 	 	
 TT296 - Nefersekheru or Pabasa 	
 TT362 - Paanemwaset, Priest of Amun; from the 19th Dynasty
 TT363 - Paraemheb, Overseer of Singers of Amun; from the 19th Dynasty
 TT365 - Nefermenu, Overseer of Wig-Makers of Amun in Karnak, Scribe of the Treasury of Amun
 TT369 - Khaemwaset, High priest of Ptah, Third priest of Amun; from the 19th Dynasty
 TT370 - Unknown, Royal Scribe; from the Ramesside Period
 TT371 - Unknown, from the Ramesside Period
 TT372 - Amenkhau, Overseer of Carpenters of the Temple of Ramesses III; from the 20th Dynasty
 TT373 - Amenmessu, Scribe of the Altar of the Lord of the Two Lands	
 TT374 - Amenemopet, Treasury Scribe in the Ramesseum
 TT405 - Khenti, Nomarch; from the First Intermediate Period
 B1 - Mehehy, Priest of Amun 	El-Khokha (Location lost); from the Ramesside Period
 B2 - Amenneferu, Priest at the fore 	El-Khokha (Location lost); from the mid Dynasty 18
 B3 - Hauf, El-Khokha (Location lost); from the Late Period

See also
 List of Theban Tombs

References

Theban tombs